A New Testament amulet (also called a talisman) is an ancient hand-written portion of the New Testament, commonly worn as a charm. The Lord's Prayer is the most common text found on amulets. Also commonly found are the opening verses of each of the four New Testament gospels.

The numbering system begun by Ernst von Dobschütz for New Testament Greek Amulets assigned each recovered Amulet a Blackletter character 𝔗 (indicating Talisman) followed by a superscript number. Von Dobschütz continued the list through 𝔗9. The additional numbers assigned below continue this numbering in the order suggested by Brice C. Jones.
 Digital images are referenced with direct links to the hosting web pages. The quality and accessibility of the images is as follows:

List of New Testament Amulets

See also

Other lists of New Testament manuscripts 
 List of New Testament papyri
 List of New Testament uncials
 List of New Testament minuscules
 List of New Testament lectionaries
 List of New Testament Latin manuscripts
 List of New Testament Church Fathers
 List of the Syriac New Testament manuscripts

Other articles 
 List of Egyptian papyri by date
 Novum Testamentum Graece
 Palaeography
 Biblical manuscript
 Textual criticism

References 
 
 T.S. de Bruyn & H.F. Dijkstra, “Greek Amulets and Formularies from Egypt Containing Christian Elements,” Bulletin of the American Society of Papyrologists 48 (2011) 163–216.
 Peter Head, ‘Additional Greek Witnesses to the New Testament (Ostraca, Amulets, Inscriptions, and Other Sources)’ in The Text of the New Testament in Contemporary Research: Essays on the Status Quaestionis. Second Edition (eds M.W. Holmes & B.D. Ehrman; NTTSD 42; Leiden: E.J. Brill, 2012), 429–460.
 Brice C. Jones, New Testament Texts on Greek Amulets from Late Antiquity and Their Relevance for Textual Criticism, April 2015.

Notes 

New Testament
Amulets